Szabó is a common Hungarian surname, meaning "tailor". In 2019, it occurred in 203,126 names, making it the fourth most frequent Hungarian surname.

In Czech and Slovak, a female form is Szabóová.

Origin 
It is usually originated from the present participle form ("szabó") of the verb "szab", meaning to "cut cloth to size", which then became a noun denoting the occupation of a tailor. It is also thought that the other meaning of the verb "kiszab", denoting the act of imposing fines, levying taxes etc. could have also led to the creation of the noun "szabó", meaning an occupation similar to a judge's or magistrate's. The existence of the two meanings could also justify why this surname could become so wide-spread.

People with this name 

 Attila Szabó, several people
 Bence Szabó (fencer) (born 1962), fencer
 Brett Szabo (born 1968), American basketball player
 Claire Szabó (born 1979), New Zealander politician
 Dávid Szabó (born 1990), volleyball player
 Dezső Szabó (writer) (1879–1945), Hungarian writer
 Dezső Szabó (athlete) (born 1967), decathlete
 Ecaterina Szabo (born 1966), Hungarian-born Romanian gymnast
 Ervin Szabó (1877–1918), Hungarian Marxist
 Ferenc Szabó (1921–2009), footballer
 Gabriela Szabo (born 1975), Romanian athlete
 Gabriella Szabó (born 1986), canoer
 Gábor Szabó (1936–1982), jazz guitarist
 Herma Szabo (1902–1986), Austrian figure skater
 István Szabó, several people
Joseph Szabo (born 1944), American photographer
 Joseph C. Szabo, Administrator of the United States Federal Railroad Administration (2009-2015)
 József Szabó (born 1969), swimmer
 József Szabó de Szentmiklós (1822–1894), geologist
 Yozhef Sabo, Ukrainian footballer, coach and functionairy of Hungarian descent
 Karolina Szabó (born 1961), Hungarian long-distance runner
 Károly Szabó (1916–1964), employee of the Swedish Embassy in Budapest
 Károly Ferenc Szabó (born 1943), Hungarian-born Romanian politician
 Krisztina Szabó, Hungarian-Canadian mezzo-soprano
 László Szabó, several people
 Lőrinc Szabó (1900–1957), poet and literary translator
 Magda Szabó (1917–2007), writer
 Magda Szabo (born 1934), painter of miniatures
 Matyas Szabo (born 1991), German fencer of Hungarian origin
 Miklós Szabó, several people
 Nick Szabo, computer scientist, legal scholar and cryptographer
 Nikolett Szabó (born 1980), javelin thrower
 Paul Szabo (born 1948), Canadian politician
 Rose Szabo, American author of What Big Teeth
 Sándor Szabó, several people
 Stephen Szabo, prominent scholar of transatlantic relations
 Szilvia Szabó (born 1978), canoer
 Vilmoș Szabo (1964), fencer and fencing coach
 Violette Szabo (1921–1945), secret agent
 Zoltán Szabó, several people
 Zsuzsanna Szabó-Olgyai (born 1973), Hungarian pole vaulter
 Zsuzsanna Szabó (footballer) (born 1991), Hungarian footballer

References

See also 
 Sabo (disambiguation)

Occupational surnames
Hungarian-language surnames